"One Call Away" is a song by American singer-songwriter Charlie Puth. It was released on August 20, 2015, by Atlantic Records as the second single from his debut studio album, Nine Track Mind (2016). "One Call Away" is a gospel-infused pop-soul song. It reached number 12 on the Billboard Hot 100, making it Puth's third top 40 single in the US and his third highest-charting single as a lead artist to date, behind "We Don't Talk Anymore" and "Attention".

Background
According to Puth, the song came about during a songwriting camp that his record label set up. Puth was paired with a team and they failed to come up with a song in a week, disappointing the label, until DJ Frank E, who had previously worked with Puth on "See You Again", introduced him to "One Call Away" as a song idea. Puth stated that he "absolutely" needed to sing the song, despite having not written the chorus, and that he wrote the song's bridge in addition to "a couple of lines". Charlie told iHeart: ‘One Call Away’ is about anybody who is in love with somebody, and doesn’t get to see that person every single day. That’s the e-cards that people used to send to you over email. I feel like people use them more as memes now. Well, this is your musical meme for not seeing a person that you love so dearly for a really, really long time.

Chart performance
In the United States, "One Call Away" debuted at number 89, in the week ending December 19, 2015. In the UK, the song debuted at number 73, in the week ending December 3, 2015. The song was certified double Platinum by the RIAA on July 28, 2016. As of July 2017, the song has sold 1,575,000 copies domestically.

In New Zealand, the song debuted at number 39, in the week ending October 12, 2015; the next week, it jumped from 39 to 9, becoming his third hit top ten in New Zealand. It reached its peak, number 3, the following week.

Music video
Directed by Mark Staubach, the music video for "One Call Away" was released on September 14, 2015, by his own YouTube channel.

It begins with Puth playing Rachmaninoff's "Morceaux de fantaisie, Op. 3, Prelude No. 2 in C-sharp minor" on a grand piano in a college music classroom, before he is interrupted by a girl (played by Ellie Hahn) who comes into the room to watch, before she puts on headphones, and the actual song begins. It then cuts to clips of him walking to and sitting down in class. He nudges his friend (played by Stephen Puth, his younger brother) as he sees the girl sit down behind him, still wearing her headphones. He looks back at her and she smiles, but her boyfriend then sits down next to her, which Puth sees, and then sinks down into his chair.

Puth and a couple of classmates are shown sitting in a gymnasium, while looking at her status updates on a Facebook-like website. He is then shown walking down a bookstore, while she is reading on the other side; he gets to the end of the aisle and they see each other, but she walks away dismissively. Shots of a film being cut and hung up are shown. She is then shown practicing a ballet on stage with Puth accompanying on grand piano. Her boyfriend comes, they get in a fight, and she leaves, sitting down outside and covering her face with her hands, to cry.

Longer shots of the film editing are shown. The girl is shown going to the Palace Theater in Los Angeles; as she sits down Puth sees her from the projection booth. He loads the projector with the film he has made and starts it. Clips from classic films are shown on the screen, beginning with characters in peril and then being saved (matching the lyrics), and ending in a romantic scene. The clips of the characters being saved causes her to look up at the booth, where he smiles down at her and she smiles back.

The music video has over 750 million views as of late October 2021.

Remix
The official remix features a guest verse from American rapper Tyga. There is another remix entitled "One Call Away (Coast to Coast Mix)" that features a four-person duet with Charlie, Sofia Reyes, Brett Eldredge and Ty Dolla Sign.

Charts

Weekly charts

Year-end charts

Certifications

References

External links

2015 singles
Charlie Puth songs
Songs written by Mozella
Songs written by Breyan Isaac
Songs written by Matt Prime
Songs written by DJ Frank E
Song recordings produced by DJ Frank E
Atlantic Records singles
Songs written by Charlie Puth
2015 songs